Spirama paecila is a species of moth of the family Erebidae. It is found in Brazil (Para).

References

Moths described in 1852
Spirama
Moths of South America
Taxa named by Achille Guenée